"Night Family" is the fourth episode of the sixth season of the Adult Swim animated television series Rick and Morty. Written by Rob Schrab and directed by Jacob Hair, the episode likely pays homage to Rod Serling's television series Night Gallery.

Plot 
At breakfast, Rick Sanchez introduces the rest of his family to a "Somnambulator", which the entire group excitedly uses. The device splits a user's conscious mind into a "Daymanoid", and their unconscious mind into a "Night Person." The Daymanoids treat the Night People terribly, forcing them to get six-packs, learn the trumpet and learn Spanish. The Daymanoid half of Jerry, the only one who treats his Night Person nicely, tells the family that the Night People would prefer if the dishes were rinsed. Daymanoid Rick, furious, makes a mess on the kitchen table for the Night People to clean, and exclaims "they exist only to do the shit we don't want to do!"

For the next few nights, the frustrated Night People, led by Night Summer, destroy the house and lock the Somnambulator in the garage. The Daymanoids try to leave the range of the device, which would merge their minds again and rid of the Night people. This leads to a chase sequence in which Night Summer tries to catch the Daymanoids, ending with all the rest of the family except Rick becoming unconscious again (becoming Night people). They explain that they will come to a truce if Rick rinses his dishes, which he refuses, which gives the Night People full power, and they go on numerous vacations. 

In the post-credits scene, the Night People, frustrated with having to pay taxes and do chores, destroy the Somnambulator, merging their minds with the Daymanoids and becoming normal again; the Smith family are then horrified to learn that the Choco Taco was permanently discontinued while they were asleep.

Production 

Before season six's release, the episode titles were informally revealed, including Night Family's. On the September 19 and 21, extended previews were released. In advance, the episode was projected to release on Sunday, September 25, 11pm in the United States, and 4 am in the United Kingdom.

In the video Inside The Episode: "Night Family" on Adult Swim's YouTube channel, Rick and Morty co-creator Dan Harmon explains that the episode concept was carried down for many years. While writing, Rob Schrab came across the question "...what if Summer was the Big Bad of the episode?". The prospect of an Evil Summer dates back to August 2021, where Spencer Grammer, her voice actor, gave hints.

Themes and cultural references 
The title is likely an ode to the horror television series Night Gallery by Rod Serling. The introductory poem at the beginning of the episode is Fragment of an Agon by T.S. Eliot. The term 'Daymanoid', used throughout, derives from the word 'Demonoid', coming from the 1981 Mexican horror film 'Demonoid: Messenger of Death.' Some news outlets claim that the episode takes traits from, or directly parodies Apple TV+'s Severance, though the episode likely would've been in development before the show's release.

Soundtrack

Ratings and critical reception 
The review aggregator website Rotten Tomatoes reported a 100% approval rating with an average score of 8.3/10 based on 7 reviews.

Night Family was watched by 300,000 people in the United States.

This episode was generally well received, like the first three episodes of the season. Corey Plante of Inverse compared the episode to the 2019 Jordan Peele film Us and the made-for-streaming series Severance. He appreciated the heavy horror themes of the episode, which he says was accentuated by Ryan Elder's score. Den of Geek author Joe Matar said that the story being set in the Smith household and featuring the entire Smith family worked well. Matar continued that the science fiction concepts worked well because the family drama, which he says was lacking in seasons 4-5, worked in collaboration. Collider's Marco Vito Oddo wrote that it was the most lacking episode of the season thus far, but still explored the "absurd limits of a simple plot". In their 'A'-graded review of the episode, Richard Urquiza of winteriscoming.net, a subsidiary of FanSided, stated that it was the best episode of the season so far, with comedy, a funny story, and a neat concept. Maik Zehrfeld gave a 4/5 star review, writing that the opening was too akin to Family Guy, but it picked up as it continued, showing a domino effect narrative structure and a "catchy story".

References

External links 

2022 American television episodes
Rick and Morty episodes
Television episode articles with short description for single episodes